The Poland National American Football team represents Poland in international American football competitions. The team is controlled by the Polish American Football Association. The team was formed in 2012, consisting mainly of Polish American Football League players and coaching staff. In addition to players from the Polish league,  players from the York Lions, Braunschweig Lions, Kouvola Indians and Kristiansand Gladiators have also participated in games.

History
The first international American football game played by Poland was played 2 February 2013 in the Atlas Arena in Łódź, when the Polish national team met the Swedish national team in an Arena football game. Polish teams had previously played unofficial matches, beginning in 2005.

There are many Poles and players with Polish roots currently playing  in NFL; for example Sebastian Janikowski, Tom Zbikowski, Chris, Dan, Rob Gronkowski, and in the past: Rich Szaro, Chester Marcol, Stas Maliszewski, Ron Jaworski, Zeke Bratkowski. For more persons of Polish descent, see National Polish-American Sports Hall of Fame and list of Polish Americans. The latest addition is a son of Nigerian and a Polish woman, Babatunde Aiyegbusi who signed up with Minnesota Vikings after playing basketball as well as North American football for many Polish, Czech, and German clubs.

Roster for the 2017 World Games

European Championship
In 2015 Poland is competing in the IFAF level qualifying playoff circuit for the first time.

IFAF World Championship record

Head coaches
 Maciej Cetnerowski (2012–2015)
 Bradley Arbon (2015–2017)

All time results

External links
  Poland national American football team Official website
  Polish American Football League Official website

Men's national American football teams
American football
American football in Poland
2012 establishments in Poland
American football teams established in 2012
National sports teams established in 2012